Flag iris typically refers to several species of iris plant:

Iris pseudacorus, the yellow flag iris
Iris versicolor, the larger blue flag iris
Iris prismatica, the slender blue flag iris